La Petite Morte is a 2003 Canadian documentary directed by Emmanuelle Schick Garcia about the pornography business in France, centering on the interviews of Raffaela Anderson, John B. Root and others. It won three film festival awards for Best Documentary and one nomination for Best Documentary.

The title is a reference to "la petite mort", French for "the little death", an idiom and euphemism for orgasm.

Interviewees
Interviewees include Raffaëla Anderson, Fred Coppula, Brigitte Lahaie, Clara Morgane, Francis Mischkind, Oceane, and John B. Root.

Reception 
Kevin Thomas of the Los Angeles Times wrote, "Both Schick and Anderson have too much contempt for porn, its makers and its audience for their tedious film to have much significance."

References

External links
 
  (archived March 15, 2008)
 MIT Press
 Independent Film Quarterly
 Radio Canada
 Indiewire
 Daily Bruin
 Venue Magazine (Spanish)
 SDP Noticias (Spanish)

2003 films
2003 short documentary films
Canadian short documentary films
Documentary films about pornography
French-language Canadian films
2000s Canadian films